Bjørg Engh (June 4, 1932 – December 21, 2009) was a Norwegian actress from Oslo.

Career
Engh acted in several films. In 1958 she played the role of Sonja, Bernhard's wife, in De dødes tjern. Later she appeared in films such as Klokker i måneskinn and television series such as Skipper Worse. Engh also performed at the National Theater in Oslo in performances of Marcel Aymé's Clérambard in 1960 and Elektra in 1964.

Filmography
1958: De dødes tjern as Sonja, Bernhard's wife
1964: Klokker i måneskinn as the maid
1965: Smeltedigelen (TV) as Mercy Lewis
1966: Lille Lord Fauntleroy (TV) as Lady Fauntleroy

References

External links
 
 Bjørg Engh at Sceneweb
 Bjørg Engh at Filmfront
 Bjørg Engh at the National Theater

1932 births
2009 deaths
20th-century Norwegian actresses
Actresses from Oslo